Stary Ashit (İśke Äşit) is a rural locality (a village) in Kuyanovsky Selsoviet, Krasnokamsky District, Bashkortostan, Russia. The population was 16 as of 2010. There is 1 street.

Geography 
Stary Ashit is located 61 km southeast of Nikolo-Beryozovka (the district's administrative centre) by road. Taktalachuk is the nearest rural locality.

References 

Rural localities in Krasnokamsky District